Giuseppe Niccolò Vicentino, called Rospigliosi, was an Italian painter and wood-engraver of the Renaissance. He was born at Vicenza c. 1510, and worked at Bologna about 1540. His method was chiaroscuro. He used three blocks, and did much to develop the process. Among other cuts by him are: A Sibyl reading a Book;  Hercules killing the Nemaean Lion after Raphael; Death of Ajax after Polidoro da Caravaggio; Venue embracing Cupid; and Glelia escaping from Porsenna's camp.

References

People from Vicenza
Italian engravers
16th-century Italian painters
Italian male painters
Painters from Bologna
Italian Renaissance painters
Year of death unknown
1510 births